Distribuciones Froiz, S.A. is a Spanish supermarket chain based in Poio, Galicia. It operates in the Spanish regions of Galicia, Castile and León, Castilla-La Mancha, Madrid and in Northern Portugal. It is the seventeenth company with the highest turnover in Galicia. The company was founded in Pontevedra in 1970 by Magín Alfredo Froiz Planes, deceased on 10 March 2022, and remains a family-run business.

In October 2014, Froiz bought rival supermarket Supermercados Moldes becoming the third biggest supermarket chain in Galicia.

Operations

Froiz's operations are divided into four formats, differentiated by size and the range of products sold. Tandy or Merca Mas is the name  given to Froiz's franchised convenience stores.

Sponsorship
Froiz is the owner of the cycling team Grupo Deportivo Supermercados Froiz (Súper Froiz) and the main sponsor of the Óscar Pereiro Foundation cycling team.

See also
 List of supermarket chains in Spain

References

External links
 Official
 Official website
 
 

 Financial
 Distribuciones Froiz S.A. — Hoover's

Retail companies established in 1970
Pontevedra
Companies based in Galicia (Spain)
Supermarkets of Spain
Supermarkets of Portugal
Spanish brands
1970 establishments in Spain
Companies based in Pontevedra
Economy of Pontevedra
Companies established in 1970
Companies of Spain